The Golden Book Encyclopedia is a set of children's encyclopedias published by Western Printing and Lithographing Company under the name Golden Press. Advertised with circulars in newspapers, the encyclopedias were sent out in weekly or bi-weekly installments. Supermarket chains, such as Acme Markets, used these encyclopedias as a promotional hook to lure shoppers.

The front page of every volume describes the books as, "Fact-filled Volumes Dramatically Illustrated with More Than 6,000 Pictures.  The Only Encyclopedia for Young Grade-school children. Accurate and Authoritative. Entertainingly written and illustrated to make learning an adventure." Subjects covered in the series included nature, science, history, geography, literature, and the arts.

Editions 
The first edition of the encyclopedia was published in a joint venture between Simon & Schuster and Western Printing and Lithographing Company in 1946. The author of the edition was Dorothy A. Bennett and the illustrator was Cornelius De Witt. A 16-volume hardcover edition was published from 1959 to 1969; these sets were written by Bertha Morris Parker, formerly of the Laboratory Schools at the University of Chicago and research associate at the Chicago Natural History Museum. The 1988 edition lists the author as "Golden Press," and contains 4 extra volumes, making it a 20-volume set.

Volumes 
1959 Edition
Volume 1 - Aardvark to Army 
Volume 2 - Arthur to Blood
Volume 3 - Boats to Cereal
Volume 4 - Chalk to Czechoslovakia
Volume 5 - Daguerreotype to Epiphyte
Volume 6 - Erosion to Geysers 
Volume 7 - Ghosts to Houseplants
Volume 8 - Hudson to Korea
Volume 9 - Labor Day to Matches
Volume 10 - Mathematics to Natural Gas
Volume 11 - Navy to Parasites
Volume 12 - Paricutin to Quicksand
Volume 13 - Rabbits to Signaling
Volume 14 - Silk to Textiles
Volume 15 - Thailand to Volcanoes
Volume 16 - Wales to Zoos

Other versions
Besides publishing an encyclopedia for children, Golden Press has also published similar reference material, which includes The Golden Book Encyclopedia of Natural Science and The Golden Home and High School Encyclopedia.

Sales
60 million copies of individual Encyclopedia volumes were sold between 1959 and 1961.

References

G B Encyclopedia
Children's encyclopedias
American encyclopedias
English-language encyclopedias
Series of children's books
Publications established in 1946